Jarek Srnensky (born 16 January 1963) is a Swiss former professional tennis player.

Srnensky is Czechoslovakian by birth, but grew up in the Swiss town of Chur.

While competing on the professional tour he twice featured in the French Open main draw as a doubles player, in 1985 and 1986, both times partnering João Soares.

Challenger titles

Doubles: (1)

References

External links
 
 

1963 births
Living people
Swiss male tennis players
Czechoslovak emigrants to Switzerland
People from Vsetín